Bush Bucks is a South African association football club. The club was founded in 1957 and originally based in Mthatha in the Eastern Cape. In 2001, the team moved to East London. It was nicknamed Imbabala (The Bucks).

History
The club was formed by a former official of the Bush Bucks club from Durban who had moved to the area. It was named Umtata Bush Bucks and played at the South African top level (NSL) from 1976 to 1994, managing to win the league in 1985, 4 finishes in the top-7, They won  two Telkom Cups (in 1993 and 1996). They remained at the top level (renamed PSL), moving to East London (outside of the former homeland of Transkei) in 2001, until suffering relegation at the end of the 2002/03 season. They returned after only one season, but were relegated again at the end of 2005/06 season.

Since 2007 sole owner is Sturu Pasiya when he purchased a license to participate in the Vodacom League from Lion City FC.

The club plays in the SAFA Second Division Eastern Cape division.

Major Honours
PSL(formerly NSL) winners 1985

Telkom Knockout Winners 1993, 1996

References

Association football clubs established in 1957
Defunct soccer clubs in South Africa
Former Premier Soccer League clubs
Former National First Division clubs
Soccer clubs in the Eastern Cape
1957 establishments in South Africa
East London, Eastern Cape